Hayday is an English surname that originated in Brittany. Notable people with the surname include:

 Adrian Hayday, English professor
 Andria Hayday, American game designer
 Arthur Hayday, English unionist and politician
 Frederick Hayday, British unionist
 James Hayday, London bookbinder

See also
 
 Haidai (surname)

English-language surnames